The Qatari ambassador in Beijing is the official representative of the Government in Doha to the Government of the People's Republic of China and in Pyongyang

List of representatives

References 

 
China
Qatar